The Orzeł incident occurred at the beginning of World War II in September 1939, when the interned Polish submarine  escaped from Tallinn, in neutral Estonia, to the United Kingdom. The Stalinist Soviet Union used the incident as one of the pretexts to justify its eventual military invasion and occupation of Estonia in June 1940.

Background
Orzeł was docked at Oksywie when Nazi Germany attacked Poland and began the Second World War. The submarine at first took part in Operation Worek, but withdrew from the Polish coast on 4 September as the situation evolved. Damaged by German minesweepers and leaking oil, it headed for Tallinn, which it reached on 14 September 1939 at about 01:30. Lieutenant-Commander Henryk Kłoczkowski, the commanding officer, was taken to a hospital the next day for treatment of an unidentified illness from which he had been suffering since 8 September.

The Hague Convention of 1907 enjoined signatories, including Germany, from interfering with the right of enemy warships to use neutral ports within certain limits. Initially, the Estonians were quite accommodating of Orzeł and helped with the repair of a damaged compressor. However, probably because of German pressure, Estonian military authorities soon boarded the ship, declared the crew interned, confiscated all the navigation aids and maps and started to dismantle the armaments. An Estonian officer removed the naval ensign from the submarine's stern.

Incident

Escape

The crew of ORP Orzeł conspired to escape under the new command of its chief officer, Lieutenant Jan Grudziński, and its new first officer, Lieutenant Andzej Piasecki. This started with Grudziński's sabotage of the torpedo hoist on 16 September, preventing the Estonians from removing the six aft torpedoes. Since it was a Sunday, another could not be immediately acquired. Meanwhile, Boatswain Władysław Narkiewicz took a small boat around the harbour. Under the guise of fishing, he covertly measured the depth of the planned escape route.

Another sailor sabotaged the submarine's mooring lines.

On 18 September 1939, at around 00:00h midnight, the portlights suffered an unexplained malfunction. Seizing the opportunity, Lieutenant Grudziński prepared the submarine for departure. The crew was forced to delay by the arrival of an Estonian officer. After a 30-minute inspection, he deemed nothing to be out of the ordinary and bid the Poles goodnight. The crew resumed with their plans. Two Estonian guards at the dock were lured aboard and nonviolently taken prisoner, the lighting in the port was sabotaged and the mooring lines were cut with an axe. Both engines were started, and the submarine made her escape in the darkness.

Estonian spotlights began sweeping the harbour from buildings to the quay until they finally found Orzeł. The Estonians opened fire with machine guns and light artillery, which damaged the conning tower. Heavier guns supposedly failed to open fire for fear of damaging other ships. At the mouth of the harbour, the submarine briefly ran aground on a sandbar but quickly managed to get free and escape to the Baltic Sea.

At sea
Lieutenant Grudziński intended to seize the maps of a German vessel, as all of the navigational aids of Orzeł except for a guide of Swedish lighthouses, had been confiscated. No German merchant ships were ever sighted, however. After three weeks of searching, it was decided to leave the Baltic and head for Britain. It took two days to pass through the heavily guarded entrance. The only references that the Poles had were the lighthouse guide and a rudimentary map drawn by the navigation officer.

The German and Estonian press covering the incident first suggested that the two captured guards had possibly been killed by the Polish sailors. It later turned out that, in fact, they had been released off of the coast of Sweden in a rubber dinghy and provided with clothing and food for their safe return home. The guards were also given 50 US dollars each, as the Polish crew believed that those "returning from the underworld deserve to travel first class only".

Orzeł arrived off the coast of Scotland on 14 October 1939. The crew sent out a signal in broken English, and a Royal Navy destroyer came out and escorted them into port. The arrival of Orzeł surprised the British Admiralty, which had long presumed the submarine to be lost. 
 was subject to a refit and subsequently brought into service alongside the Royal Navy in the 2nd Submarine Flotilla in mid-January 1940 to patrol the North Sea.

Diplomatic crisis and aftermath
After the submarine's escape from Tallinn, the Telegraph Agency of the Soviet Union (TASS) "reported" that the Estonian government had "deliberately" allowed Orzeł to escape and that "other Polish submarines were hiding" in ports throughout the Baltic countries.

The Stalinist Soviet Union, having invaded Poland on 17 September 1939, accused Estonia of conspiring with the Polish seamen along with "aiding them to escape" and challenged the neutrality of Estonia. Orzeł sank no enemy vessels during her journey from Estonia to Britain, yet the Soviet government also blamed the Polish submarine, and Estonia, for the alleged loss of the Soviet  tanker Metallist in Narva Bay in Estonian territorial waters on 26 September 1939. The Soviets demanded to be allowed to establish military bases on Estonian soil and threatened with full-scale war if Estonia did not comply with the ultimatum. Accusations related to the submarine incident served as a political cover for Stalin's actions since in the secret clauses of the August 1939 Nazi-Soviet Pact Germany had already provided implicit approval for the Soviet takeover of Estonia, Latvia and Finland. The Orzeł incident was used by Stalin to force the "treaty of defence and mutual assistance" on Estonia, which was signed on 28 September 1939 and allowed the Soviet Union to establish several military bases on Estonian soil. The Soviet troops occupied the whole territory of Estonia in June 1940.

Notes

References

1939 in Estonia
Military history of Poland during World War II
Military history of Estonia during World War II
Military history of the Soviet Union during World War II
Occupation of the Baltic states
Diplomatic incidents
Maritime incidents in September 1939